Rickettsia aeschlimannii infection is a condition characterized by a rash of maculopapules.

See also 
 Tick-borne lymphadenopathy
 American tick bite fever
 List of cutaneous conditions

References 

 

Bacterium-related cutaneous conditions
Rickettsioses